The United States Army Snow Plow No. SN-87 is a historic railroad snow plow, that is part of the collection of the Arkansas Railroad Museum in Pine Bluff, Arkansas.  It is a 74,000-lb. wedge plow, mounted on a pair of trucks, built in 1953 by the O.F. Jordan Company of East Chicago, Indiana, under contract to the United States Army.  It was used by the Army until 1990, when it was donated to the museum.

The plow was listed on the National Register of Historic Places in 2007.

See also

National Register of Historic Places listings in Jefferson County, Arkansas

References

Arkansas Railroad Museum
Buildings and structures completed in 1953
National Register of Historic Places in Pine Bluff, Arkansas
Railway vehicles on the National Register of Historic Places in Arkansas
Snowplows